The 2014 season was the Atlanta Silverbacks' 18th season of existence, and their 4th consecutive season playing in the North American Soccer League, the second division of the American soccer pyramid.

Background 

The Atlanta Silverbacks had a long run in 2013. In the Spring Season, they finished first place and booked their ticket to host the Soccer Bowl. They finished seventh in the fall season, but still were in the final match to decide the NASL Champion. The Silverbacks lost 1–0 to the New York Cosmos in the 2013 Soccer Bowl.

They had close results in the U.S. Open Cup, winning their first match against fourth division opponent Georgia Revolution 3–2. Then losing to MLS side Real Salt Lake 2–3 in overtime a week later.

On December 9, 2013, first-year head coach Brian Haynes was not given a contract extension, leaving the Silverbacks without a head coach.

On January 7, the Silverbacks announced that they would eliminate the head coaching position, and have technical director, Eric Wynalda, manage the team. Wynalda has the most professional experience of the club staff as he played in MLS, Germany, and Mexico for 20 years. Wynalda also has 106 US National Team caps, and is third on the countries all-time scoring list with 34 goals.

Club

Current roster
As of October 1, 2014

On loan

Technical Staff
  Jason Smith – Head Coach
  Eric Wynalda – Technical Director
  Ricardo Montoya – Assistant Coach
  Alejandro Pombo – Assistant Coach
  Eduardo "Lalo" Liza – Assistant Coach
  Juan Castellanos – Fitness Coach

Front Office Staff
  Boris Jerkunica – Chairman
  John Latham – Vice-Chairman
  Andy Smith – General Manager
  Neal Malone – Marketing and PR Manager"
  Michael Wheeler – Account Executive  Kaila Muecke – Account Executive  Malcolm Johnson – Account Executive  Pete Zeskind – Account Executive  Nathan Charlton – Operations Manager  Samantha Yourstone – Event Marketing CoordinatorTransfers

In

Out

Loan In

Pre-season friendlies

Pre-season

 Competitions 

 NASL 

 Spring season 

 Table 

 Results summary 

 Results by round 

 Match results 

 Fall season 

 Table 

 Results summary 

 Results by round 

 Match results 

 US Open Cup 

 Playoffs 
The Championship will be contested by the winners of the spring and fall seasons hosting the next best two teams in the full year regular season table. The semi-finals will take place on November 8 and 9, with the two winners of the two games playing in the Championship game hosted by the team with the best overall regular season record, on November 15.

 Statistics 

Appearances

Numbers in parentheses denote appearances as substitute.
Players with no appearances not included in the list.Last updated on October 1, 2014Goalscorers
This includes all competitive matches.Last updated on September 20, 2014Clean sheets
This includes all competitive matches. Last updated on September 20, 2014Disciplinary record
This includes all competitive matches.Last updated on October 1, 2014''

See also 
 2014 in American soccer
 2014 North American Soccer League season
 Atlanta Silverbacks

References 

Atlanta Silverbacks seasons
Atlanta Silverbacks
Atlanta Silverbacks